Nikko Bryan Oreta Huelgas (born July 19, 1991) is a Filipino professional triathlete who competes internationally. He is the first Filipino to win a gold medal in the men's individual triathlon event at the Southeast Asian Games securing the feat in the 2015 edition. He also successfully defended his title at the 2017 Southeast Asian Games.

He is currently the captain of the Philippine National Triathlon team. He is a member of the Philippine Olympic Committee (POC) Athletes’ Commission serving as their Chairman. He also has a seat at the POC's Executive Board.

He used to represent the varsity swimming and track and field team for De La Salle University in the UAAP during his college days.

Education
Huelgas studied at the Elizabeth Seton School in Las Piñas for his high school studies. For his collegiate studies, Huelgas attended the De La Salle University where he obtained a Bachelor of Science in Marketing degree in 2014.

Youth career
Huelgas was part co-captain of the swimming team of his high school, Elizabeth Seton School, and was also a member of the school's water polo team. He was also the captain of the school's badminton team.

He was a member of the collegiate swimming team of his alma mater, the De La Salle University (DLSU). His shift to triathlon began when he took part in a 5k fun run in January 2009 where coach Rick Reyes of the Triathlon Association of the Philippines (TRAP) scouted him and thereafter invited him to join an aquathlon. Huelgas bought his first bicycle in May of the same year and began participating in triathlons. He then also joined the DLSU track and field team in 2010, where he competed in the long-distance run events. In January 2010, he qualified for the pool of the triathlon and water polo national teams, but chose to pursue a career in triathlon.

Professional career
Huelgas made his professional triathlon debut under the Junior Men division during the 2010 Subic Bay ASTC Triathlon U23 and Junior Asian Championships in May 2010. He made his official debut in the Elite Men category shortly, particularly September of the same year, at the 2010 Yilan ITU Triathlon Cup.

At age 19, he placed his studies on hold to train in Subic for the 2010 Asian Games.

Since then, he has been competing consistently at local and international triathlon competitions. In September 2014, he represented the Philippines as part of national triathlon team in the Incheon Asian Games. There, he secured an 11th-place finish in the Elite Men's category and 6th in the Mixed Relay category.

Huelgas made history on June 7, 2015, when he became the first Filipino professional triathlete to win the gold medal in the 28th Southeast Asian Games, which was held in Singapore. He finished the race with a time of two hours, four minutes, and 32 seconds, one minute and three seconds.

On August 7, 2017, Huelgas made history once again when he successful defended his gold medal at the 29th Southeast Asian Games, clocking in at one hour, fifty-nine minutes and twenty one seconds.

He participated in the 2018 Asian Games in Indonesia where he placed 16th place and suffered a left hand fracture from a bicycle accident which caused him to be sidelined from competitive sports in early 2019. This led to his non-inclusion to the Philippines' roster for triathlon in the 2019 Southeast Asian Games to be hosted at home due to failing to be among the best two performers in the qualifying events. Huelgas is still scheduled to take part as part in the games of the mixed relay team.

ITU competitions
The following list is based upon the official ITU rankings and the Athlete's Profile Page. Unless indicated otherwise, the following events are triathlons (Olympic Distance) and belong to the Elite category.

Key: DNF = Did not finish; DNS = Did not start; U23 = Under 23

Other
Aside from being a professional triathlete, Huelgas is also the chairman of the POC Athlete's Commission. He is also commercial model who has had campaigns for the likes of Skyflakes, Cherifer Premium, Samsung, Gatorade and USANA Philippines, and also serves as a motivational speaker.

References 

Filipino male triathletes
1991 births
Living people
University Athletic Association of the Philippines players
De La Salle University alumni
Sportspeople from Metro Manila
People from Las Piñas
Triathletes at the 2010 Asian Games
Triathletes at the 2014 Asian Games
Triathletes at the 2018 Asian Games
Southeast Asian Games medalists in triathlon
Southeast Asian Games gold medalists for the Philippines
Competitors at the 2015 Southeast Asian Games
Competitors at the 2017 Southeast Asian Games
Asian Games competitors for the Philippines